Philip Wallace Hiden (April 5, 1872 – October 25, 1936) was a businessman and mayor of Newport News, Virginia.

Hiden, whose earlier ancestors from Watford, England used the spelling Hyden, was born in Orange, Virginia. He married  Martha Woodroof (1883–1959), daughter of Jesse Alphonso Woodroof and Susan (Graves) Woodroof. She was, in her own right, a researcher, genealogist, and historian who established the city library system's Virginia collection. The couple had three children.

References 

1872 births
1936 deaths
Mayors of Newport News, Virginia
Virginia city council members
People from Orange, Virginia